Events in the year 1976 in Portugal.

Incumbents
President: Francisco da Costa Gomes (until 13 July), António Ramalho Eanes (from 14 July)
Prime Minister: José Baptista Pinheiro de Azevedo (until 23 June), Vasco de Almeida e Costa (interim, from 23 June to 23 July), Mário Soares (from 23 July)

Events
 25 April - Legislative election
 27 June - Presidential election
 27 June - Azorean regional election
 Establishment of the I Constitutional Government of Portugal.
 12 December - Local election

Culture
Portugal participated in the Eurovision Song Contest 1976 with Carlos do Carmo and the song "Uma flor de verde pinho".

Sports
Portugal participated in the 1976 Summer Olympics.

In association football, for the first-tier league seasons, see 1975–76 Primeira Divisão and 1976–77 Primeira Divisão. The final of the Taça de Portugal was on 13 June.

References

 
Portugal
Years of the 20th century in Portugal
Portugal